The center of the universe may refer to:

Astronomy
Geocentric model, the astronomical model which places Earth at the orbital center of all celestial bodies
Heliocentrism, the astronomical model in which the Sun is at the orbital center of the Solar System
History of the center of the Universe, a discussion of the historical view that the Universe has a center

Mythology and religion
Axis mundi, the mythological concept of a world center
Modern geocentrism, the belief that Earth is the center of the universe as described by classical geocentric models
Space and time in the Mesoamerican religion

Media
Center of the Universe (TV series), an American sitcom
Center of the Universe, a song by Built to Spill from their album Keep It Like a Secret
Center of the Universe, an album by Admiral Twin
"Centre of the Universe", a song from the album Epica, by Kamelot
"Centre of the Universe", a debut single of Arthur Koldomasov 
"Center of the Universe" (song), a song by Swedish house producer Axwell
"Center of the Universe", a song on the album Long Road Out of Eden by The Eagles

Places

 Centre of the Universe (Dominion Astrophysical Observatory), the former interpretive centre of the Dominion Astrophysical Observatory in Saanich, British Columbia, Canada

Other uses
An egocentrist or a narcissist may sometimes be described as thinking they are 'the center of the universe' or that 'the universe revolves around them'

See also 
 Earth's inner core
 Galactic Center
 Geographical centre of Earth 
 Great Attractor
 History of the center of the Universe
 List of places referred to as the Center of the Universe
 Sun – the center of the Solar System